This is a list of lighthouses in Curaçao.

Lighthouses

See also
 Lists of lighthouses and lightvessels

References

External links
 

Curaçao
Curaçao
Curaçao-related lists